Lillian Hansen  (born 17 May 1957) is a Norwegian politician who represents the Arbeiderpartiet. She is from Moskenes in Nordland. At the 2009 Norwegian parliamentary election, Hansen was the party's fourth candidate in Nordland.

She was formerly deputy mayor, and mayor of Moskenes municipality from 2003 to 2007. In her working life, Lillian Hansen was a bus driver.

External links
 TV2 - Presentation by the candidate.
 Bus driver training
 NRK - «Altfor mange flytter», 1. juli 2009.

1957 births
Living people
Members of the Storting
Labour Party (Norway) politicians
Mayors of places in Nordland
Women mayors of places in Norway
Bus drivers
Women members of the Storting
21st-century Norwegian politicians
21st-century Norwegian women politicians
People from Moskenes